

The iRiver Story is an e-book reader manufactured and marketed by iRiver and employing a Linux operating system.  The iRiver Story HD is a related product with higher display resolution and a display manufactured by LG.

The device uses code licensed under the GPL, but iRiver did not make the sources available immediately; this issue has since been addressed. The reader was updated in July 2010, and supports Wi-Fi. A July 2011 update integrated the device with the Google eBooks store. The product was a Target exclusive release.

The product line was discontinued in 2012.

Reception
Independent reviews of the July 2011 release of the iRiver Story were mixed. Although stating that "It's a good product", a reviewer for PC Magazine concluded that "both the hardware and software fall short of the Kindle and the Nook". Laptop Magazines reviewer wrote that the device "sports a high-definition display but falls short on ergonomics". Engadgets reviewer commented that the device "looks downright ancient" and has "relatively limited functionality". Cnets reviewer observed that its high-resolution display "does provide for added detail in images and slightly sharper text" but concluded that "it's tough to recommend over its identically priced competitors, which offer touch screens and 3G". PC Worlds reviewer found herself "frustrated by the Story HD's cheap design, poky performance, and Google Books interface".

See also
 Comparison of e-book readers
 Comparison of tablet computers

References

External links
 

Dedicated ebook devices
Electronic paper technology
Linux-based devices
IRiver